Lynda Myra Prichard (born 12 March 1950) is a New Zealand former cricketer who played as a right-handed batter. She appeared in five Test matches and five One Day Internationals for New Zealand between 1972 and 1975. She played domestic cricket for Auckland.

References

External links
 
 

1950 births
Living people
People from Taumarunui
New Zealand women cricketers
New Zealand women Test cricketers
New Zealand women One Day International cricketers
Auckland Hearts cricketers